Hilton Crawford (February 2, 1945 – July 5, 2014) was an American football defensive back. He played for the Buffalo Bills in 1969.

He died on July 5, 2014, in Buffalo, New York at age 69.

References

1945 births
2014 deaths
American football defensive backs
Grambling State Tigers football players
Buffalo Bills players
People from Converse, Louisiana